Justin Bua is an artist, author, speaker and entrepreneur. He currently lives in Texas and is best known for his lyrical narrative paintings of musicians, DJs and similar characters who help define the urban landscape. As an artist "for the people, by the people, of the people," Bua's fan base is diverse and ranges from former presidents, actors, musicians, professional athletes, dancers, to street kids and art connoisseurs.

Early life and education
Bua grew up on the Upper West Side of New York City during the height of the graffiti movement and was fascinated by the raw, visceral street life of the city. Justin attended Manhattan's Fiorello H. LaGuardia High School of Music and Performing Arts and complemented his education on the streets by writing graffiti and performing worldwide with breakdancing crews. Bua went on to the Art Center College of Design in Pasadena, California, where he earned a B.F.A in illustration and taught figure drawing at the University of Southern California for ten years.

Fine Art
Bua's distinctive figurative style combines his classical training with his background in graffiti, breakdancing and experience living in New York City. The subjects of his paintings range from recognizable figures, such as Snoop Dogg and Muhammad Ali, to anonymous people pulled from his memories, including the DJ and guitar player for which he has become best known. Each of Bua's subjects is ennobled within the urban landscape he paints and is often rendered with elongated limbs or hands, emphasizing the rhythm of the scene. Bua exhibits worldwide and was featured in a 2011 event at the Los Angeles County Museum of Art. In 2021, Bua launched his first NFT collection to much fanfare, and as of 2022, he has teamed with Ripple and the Ripple Creator Fund to bring a new series of BUAverse NFT's to the XRP ledger.

Commercial Art
Launching his reputation in the world of commercial art, Bua has designed and illustrated a myriad of products that include skateboards, CD album covers, apparel and advertising campaigns, and he served as a member of the Citizens' Stamp Advisory Committee as an appointee of the United States Postmaster General. He has also developed successful visual concepts in the entertainment world, including: the opening sequence of MTV's sketch-comedy television series, The Lyricist Lounge Show (2000–2001), EA Sports video games NBA Street (2001), NFL Street (2004), Slum Village's award-winning music video Tainted and Toyota's Long Beach Grand Prix campaign.

Speaking and Entrepreneurship
In July 2013 Bua became the first artist to launch an online school with ArtistWorks, allowing students around the world of varying levels of experience to study his curriculum and interact digitally through video exchange.

In 2013, Bua collaborated with leading nutritionist David Wolfe to create the superfood drink mix, Immortal Machine.

In 2015, the artist developed, hosted and was the executive producer for Oxygen Channel's "Street Art Throw Down" which featured graffiti and street artists, including Lady Pink, Ron English and Mear One, as guest judges.

Bibliography
 Bua, Justin (2011). The Legends of Hip Hop. New York City: Harper Design.

Presence at Auction 
In 2017, Bua was a featured artist on Artsy benefiting the American Civil Liberties Union.

See also

 List of Fiorello H. LaGuardia High School alumni
 List of people from Brooklyn
 List of street artists
 List of University of Southern California people

References

External links 

 
 Online Art School with Justin BUA

1968 births
Living people
20th-century American painters
American male painters
20th-century American non-fiction writers
20th-century American educators
21st-century American painters
21st-century American non-fiction writers

American art writers
American breakdancers
American graffiti artists
American illustrators
Art Center College of Design alumni
Fiorello H. LaGuardia High School alumni
Painters from New York City
Writers from Brooklyn
People from the Upper West Side
University of Southern California faculty
Writers from Manhattan
20th-century American male writers
21st-century American educators
American male non-fiction writers
21st-century American male writers
20th-century American male artists